The 2015 S.League season is Tampines Rovers's 20th season at the top level of Singapore football and 70th year in existence as a football club. The club also competed in the Singapore League Cup, Singapore Cup, Singapore Community Shield.

Squad

Sleague Squad

Coaching staff

Transfers

Pre-season transfers

In

Retained

Out

Trial

Friendlies

Pre-season friendlies

Team statistics

Appearances and goals

Competitions

Overview

S.League

Singapore Cup

Quarter-final

Tampines Rovers lost 2-3 on aggregate.

Singapore TNP League Cup

See also 
 2014 Tampines Rovers FC season
 2016 Tampines Rovers FC season
 2017 Tampines Rovers FC season
 2018 Tampines Rovers FC season
 2019 Tampines Rovers FC season
 2020 Tampines Rovers FC season

References

Singaporean football clubs 2015 season
Tampines Rovers FC seasons